Otto Novák (22 March 1902 – 15 October 1984) was a Czechoslovak footballer. He competed in the men's tournament at the 1924 Summer Olympics. On a club level, he played for FK Viktoria Žižkov.

References

External links
 

1902 births
1984 deaths
Czech footballers
Czechoslovak footballers
Czechoslovakia international footballers
Olympic footballers of Czechoslovakia
Footballers at the 1924 Summer Olympics
Footballers from Prague
FK Viktoria Žižkov players
Association football forwards